Wellington Weir was a weir proposed for the River Murray several kilometres south of the town of Wellington, South Australia, immediately upstream from where the river enters Lake Alexandrina.

The Wellington Weir project was announced in 2006 by the state government of South Australia, led by Premier Mike Rann, who secured the agreement of Prime Minister of Australia John Howard at the Melbourne Cup. The proposed weir was suggested as an attempt to secure drinking water supplies for the city of Adelaide.

Much of the river is already controlled by a system of locks and weirs, including the Goolwa Barrages near the Murray Mouth, and Lock 1 at Blanchetown, 274 km from the Murray Mouth. The lowering of water levels in the lake system would severely impact on all who rely on the lakes and river for their livelihood. This would include irrigators, such as those in the Langhorne Creek wine region, farmers on the Narrung Peninsula and Point Sturt, and fisherpeople at Meningie and Clayton.

Opponents of the weir contended that the planned weir would severely damage the environment of the lakes and Coorong, and that already endangered species in the lakes and Coorong could become extinct. Sim and Muller trace the complex history of the area. Lloyd argues the weir diverts attention from the real issue: the sustainability of the Murray-Darling system. There was no environmental impact assessment conducted for the proposed weir. The area that would have been impacted is subject to a Ramsar Agreement, as part of an international convention that aims to halt the loss of wetlands and conserve those that remain through wise use and management.

Questions of over-allocation of water were significant in the debate regarding the cost of a weir. For instance, why not spend money on buying water licences from irrigators that use water from the Murray River system to grow cotton in Queensland, rather than build this weir?

Local action groups, including the River, Lakes and Coorong Action Group, formed to oppose the weir. In addition to the many concerns above they also pointed out that the water held back by the proposed weir would be stagnant because "winds from the northwest to the south circulate oxygenated waters from the lakes up the river for many kilometres and winds from the north and northeast bring back freshened water benefiting both areas and precisely fitting in with our anti-clockwise wind rotation". Additionally there were widespread concerns about the release of toxic metals and acidity through the drying out of the acid sulphate soils that are widespread around the lakes.

The Wellington Weir was officially dropped by the South Australian Rann government in 2009, primarily due to community pressure about the environmental damage it would result in, and the construction of the Port Stanvac desalination plant. Drought-ending floods in the upper Darling River in late 2009 and the upper Murray River in April and May 2010 ended the matter. Significantly the local Aboriginal group, the Ngarrindjeri, performed the Murrundi Ruwe Pangari Ringbalin, (River Country Spirit Ceremony) in April 2010. They also visited the upper Darling (Brewarrina and Bourke) to make plans for it in December 2009, one week before the first of the drought ending floods.

References

Murray River
River regulation in Australia
Dams in South Australia
Dam controversies
Cancelled dams